is a Japanese manga series written and illustrated by Yasuaki Kita. It was published in Kodansha's seinen manga magazine Weekly Young Magazine from 2005 to 2010. Twenty four volumes compiling the chapters were published between 2005 and 2011. , a related series by the same author, is published in the same magazine since December 9, 2013, and thirteen volumes compiling the chapters have been released so far.

Plot 
The series follows the adventures of Jubei Sato, a high school student who transferred from Tokyo to a high school in Utsunomiya, and gets involved in a life of fighting. Sato, who is extremely self-centered, narcissistic, boisterous, and irreverent, happens to be a genius at fighting, who does not hesitate to use any means necessary to win, often using various schemes to gain an advantage over his opponents.

Volumes

Kenka Shōbai

Kenka Kagyō

References

External links

2005 manga
2014 manga
Kodansha manga
Martial arts anime and manga
Seinen manga